Apma (or Abma) is the language of central Pentecost island in Vanuatu. Apma is an Oceanic language (a branch of the Austronesian language family). Within Vanuatu it sits between North Vanuatu and Central Vanuatu languages, and combines features of both groups.

With an estimated 7,800 native speakers (in the year 2000), Apma is the most widely spoken of Pentecost's native languages, and the fifth largest vernacular in Vanuatu as a whole. In recent times Apma has spread at the expense of other indigenous languages such as Sowa and Ske. Apma is increasingly mixed with words and expressions from Bislama, Vanuatu's national language.

Name of the language
Like Pentecost's other languages, Apma is named after the local word for "what" or "something". Locally it is usually referred to simply as  "language" or  "our language".

Some linguists treat the Apma sound p as an allophone of b, and thus write the language's name as Abma. However, this interpretation of the language's phonology is disputed, and locally Apma is the preferred spelling.

Dialects and range
Modern Apma has three well-defined dialects:

 Suru Mwerani, the southernmost dialect, is the most widely spoken and well-documented dialect. It is spoken in Melsisi, Tansip, Vanrasini and surrounding villages, and in the former Sowa area between Melsisi and Ranmawot.
 Suru Rabwanga (or Suru Bo), the central dialect, is spoken in the mountainous area between Bwatnapni and Namaram. It is very similar to Suru Mwerani, and the two dialects are mixed in villages such as Bwatnapni, Enaa, Wutsunmwel and Naruwa.
 Suru Kavian is a small, endangered and very distinctive dialect, spoken in the area to the north and east of Namaram. It is hard for speakers of the other two dialects to understand.

Two other probable Apma dialects, Asuk (or Asa) in the south-west and Wolwolan (or Volvoluana) in the north, are now extinct.

Phonology
6 vowel sounds are present in Apma:

20 consonants are in Apma:

The consonant phonemes of Apma are b, d, g, h, k, l, m, n, ng (as in English "singer"), r, s, t, ts (or j), bilabial v, w, and labiovelar bw and mw. The consonants b, bw, v and w are realised as p where they occur at the end of a syllable; b may also be devoiced to p when next to an unvoiced consonant, as in  "lie down".

Clusters of consonants cannot occur within a syllable. Unlike in closely related Raga language, word roots in Apma can end with a consonant.

In archaic and northern varieties of Apma, prenasalization of consonants occurs in some environments, so that b becomes mb, d becomes nd, and g becomes ngg. This feature has been lost in modern Suru Mwerani dialect.

Apma's five vowels come in short forms (a, e, i, o and u) and long forms (aa, ee, ii, oo and uu). Long vowels typically occur where a consonant (most commonly r) has historically been lost. Vowels can occur alone or in various combinations. A few words (e.g.  "wild cane") contain a distinctive rounded high-front vowel, generally written as iu although perceived by speakers simply as a variant of u.

Stress is normally on the penultimate syllable of a word. However, syllables that end with a consonant or a long vowel take stress in precedence to other syllables.

Grammar
Basic word order in Apma is subject–verb–object. Occasionally, a subject may occur out of its usual position, in which case it is marked with :

 = The pig is eating papaya
 = It's eating papaya, the pig

Pronouns
Personal pronouns are distinguished by person and number. They are not distinguished by gender. The basic pronouns differ substantially between dialects:

The dual or plural form of "you" is occasionally used in place of the singular form to show extreme respect.

Nouns
Nouns in Apma are generally not preceded by articles. Plurality is indicated by placing the pronoun  ("them") or a number after the noun:

 = [the] bird
 = [the] birds
 = three birds

Nouns may be either free, or directly possessed. Directly possessed nouns are suffixed to indicate whom an item belongs to. For example:

 = my voice
 = your voice
 = his/her voice
 = the chief's voice
 = voice (generic)

Possession may also be indicated by the use of possessive classifiers, separate words that occur before or after the noun and take possessive suffixes. These classifiers are:

 for general possessions ("my basket")
 for things that are cared for, such as crops and livestock ("our pig")
 for things to be eaten ("your sugarcane")
 for things to be drunk ("their water")
 for associations, over which the possessor has no control ("my home island")

The possessive suffixes are as follows:

In Suru Kavian dialect, vowels in certain directly possessed nouns and possessive classifiers change according to the pattern illustrated below. This does not occur in other dialects:

A verb may be transformed into a noun by the addition of a nominalising suffix :

 = to dance (verb)
 = a dance (noun)

Modifiers generally come after a noun, although those derived from nouns may come before:

 = stone
 = four stones
 = big stone
 = small stone ( "small" comes from the noun "seed")

Verbs
Verbs in Apma are usually preceded by a subject pronoun and by a marker indicating the tense, aspect and mood of the action.

The subject pronouns are as follows:

Apma has the following tense/aspect/mood markers:

The full forms of these markers are used in the 3rd person singular (where there is no subject pronoun):

mwe leli = he does it
te leli = he did it
mwan leli = he will do it
nema leli = he's going to do it
bat leli = he should do it
ne leli = let him do it
ba leli = he's in danger of doing it

Elsewhere, short forms of these markers are suffixed to the subject pronoun:

nam leli = I do it
nat leli = I did it
nan leli = I will do it
nama leli = I'm going to do it
nabat leli = I should do it
na leli = let me do it
naba leli = I'm in danger of doing it

The imperfective marker alters to some extent to match the sound of the verb it is attached to. It is usually absent altogether when the verb begins with b or bw. (In Suru Kavian dialect, it is absent when the verb begins with any consonant other than r.) For example, in Suru Mwerani:

mwi sip = he goes down
mwo rop = he runs
mu rus = he moves
--- ban = he goes

Dual (two-person) forms consist of the plural forms with ru (or ri in Suru Kavian) inserted after the tense/aspect/mood marker:

ram leli = they do it
ramru leli = the two of them do it

There is a pattern of verb-consonant mutation whereby v at the start of a verb changes to b, and w changes to bw, in certain aspects/moods:

nat van = I went
na ban = I am going
nan ban or nan van = I will go

In northern and archaic varieties of Apma, there is also mutation of k to g, and of t to d.

Particles that can occur in a verb phrase include:

 a minimizing marker ga(m), "just"
 a partitive marker te, "partly" or "at all"
 an additive marker m(u), "furthermore"
 a completive marker, also te, "already"

The direct object, if one is present, immediately follows the verb. When the object is inanimate and already known, it need not be stated explicitly:

nat gita kik = I saw you
nat gita = I saw [it]

The passive voice can be formed by attaching the suffix -an to the verb:

te lelian = it was done

When giving instructions, verbs are preceded simply by the 2nd person subject pronoun ko or karu "you":

Ko leli! = Do it! (to one person)
Karu leli! = Do it! (to two people, or politely to a group)
Ka leli! = Do it! (plural, considered impolite and usually heard only with children)

Many verbs in Apma have distinct transitive and intransitive forms. (These distinctions have been lost to some extent in Suru Kavian dialect.) For example, in Suru Mwerani:

In Suru Mwerani dialect, and to a lesser extent Suru Rabwanga, vowels have been lost from a number of verb roots, producing 'bound verbs' which begin with a pair of consonants (such as -mni and -slo above). Since clusters of consonants within a syllable are prohibited in Apma, speakers usually cite these verbs with a prefix such as mwa- attached (mwamni, mwaslo), and do not identify them as words when unprefixed.

In addition to verbs denoting actions, Apma has a large number of stative verbs that describe an item. For example, there is a verb "to be red" (meme) and a verb "to be good" (gabis). Apma uses stative verbs in many of the situations where adjectives would be used in English.

Unlike neighbouring Raga language, Apma has a copular verb, (v)i or bi. The phrase tei… meaning "it was…" (tevi… in Suru Kavian) is commonly used to focus attention on something or to set the scene.

Verbs in Apma can be linked together in a variety of serial verb constructions.

Negation 
Negation is marked by the discontinuous morpheme ba…nga. The ba always occurs before the verb and the nga occurs after the verb or after the direct object should one occur as seen in (1) where 'step' is the verb and 'breadfruit branch' the direct object. In the absence of a direct object the verb alone sits within the morpheme as seen in.

A derivative of the common negative morpheme exists to indicate in-completion. Bado… ngamwa means 'not yet' and codes for the verb not being completed, with expectation that completion of the verb will eventually occur as seen in (2). Here, the -do in bado codes for 'yet' as does the -mwa in ngamwa. In comparison, (3) indicates that the subject of the sentence is 'not very good', leaving no room for further completion. Bado…ngamwa is not used in this examples but provides evidence of how the sentence is effected by in-completion. Also to be noted is that in both examples a word for 'be.good' is included but in (2) it occurs once while it occurs twice in (3). This could indicate that mnok or another action verb takes the place of one of the ''be.good''s in (3).

Non-Verbal Sentences 
The inclusion of a negative marker transforms a sentence from non-verbal to verbal, as such, non-verbal negative sentences do not exist in Apma. In order to successfully indicate negation, some form of the copular verb bibi, meaning 'be', must be inserted within the morpheme, otherwise nothing would occur within the discontinued morpheme. In (4), the copular verb bibi is in the third person singular form and occurs before the partitive te and the verb.

Irrealis Events and Hypotheticals 
If an event is unlikely to occur, the irrealis modality marker mwan occurs before the negation morpheme as seen in (5).

Although a hypothetical can be classed as an irrealis event, the conventions differ very slightly. In a hypothetical situation bat precedes the negation morpheme as seen in (6). Here, the hypothetical marker indicates that the new word for "bwala kul" did not exist in the past therefore, if it had been used, it could not have been recognised.

Prohibitive 
The prohibitive refers to the negation of an imperative as seen in (7) and is marked with the discontinuous prohibitive marker ba…an that functions similarly to the negation marker. The verb is enclosed in the morpheme and there is no direct object. Prohibitives are largely intransitive, thus the object is implied as seen in (8) where the food being eaten is not mentioned by the speaker but is still understood by interlocutors. It could be that because the focus is on the act of eating rather than what is specifically being eaten, the inclusion of a direct object would only distract from the emphatic nature of the imperative.

Te in its partitive form almost always precedes the an in a prohibitive sentence as seen in (8). The partitive is used to create emphasis, which is a defining characteristic of imperatives. Although there are examples of prohibitives without te, they do not occur in natural discourse.

Vocabulary

Sample phrases

Notable Apma words
Boroguu, the name of a popular kava variety, comes from Apma.

Documentation
Notes on the grammar and vocabulary of Apma language were first made by Catholic missionaries at Melsisii in the early 20th century.

Cindy Schneider of the University of New England completed a grammar and short dictionary of the Suru Mwerani dialect of Apma language in the late 2000s. Building on Schneider's work, Pascal Temwakon and Andrew Gray produced Bongmehee, an illustrated dictionary of the language.

The other two dialects of Apma remain poorly documented.

Abbreviations 
Abbreviations used in examples are taken from Cindy Schneider's description.

ASSOC:associative construction
COMM:comment marker (in a topic-comment structure)
NEG1:first part of discontinuous negative morpheme
NEG2:second part of discontinuous negative morpheme
PART:partitive
PRHB:prohibitive

References
 Pages from: Schneider, Cynthia. 2010. A grammar of Abma: a language of Pentecost Island, Vanuatu:

 Other notes

Bibliography
 Crowley, Terry. 2000. The language situation in Vanuatu. Current Issues in Language Planning. Vol 1, No 1.
 Gray, Andrew. 2013. The Languages of Pentecost Island. British Friends of Vanuatu Society.
 Lynch, John & Terry Crowley. 2001. Languages of Vanuatu: A New Survey and Bibliography. Pacific Linguistics. Canberra: Australian National University.

 Temwakon, Pascal & Andrew Gray. 2008. Bongmehee. Copy in Vanuatu National Library.

External links
 The Languages of Pentecost Island - information on Apma
 PARADISEC open-access archive of Apma language recordings
 Database of audio recordings in Apma (Melsisi) - basic Catholic prayers 

Languages of Vanuatu
Penama languages